This is a list of rolling stock used by the Mid-Suffolk Light Railway.

Locomotives

Original

LNER Class J64 (the reclassification of the original 3 MSLR engines)
LNER Class J65
LNER Class J15

Current

The museum currently has six locomotives on site, three operational steam engines, and "1604" which is under restoration and owned by the MSLR. It also has two Ruston diesels; a 165 named "Alston" and a Ruston 48, which is very similar to the engine used to take up the railway.

Previous
LNER Class J15 No. 7564 , built 1912.
LB&SCR A1 class No. 662  'Martello', built 1875.
Andrew Barclay  W/No. 2069 'Little Barford', built 1939.
Hawthorn Leslie  'Falmouth Docks and Engineering Co. No. 3'
W. G. Bagnall No. 2565 , built 1946

Rolling stock

Passenger carriages  
The MSLR's coaching stock is entirely made up of ex-GER carriages, to replicate what the line's original stock would've been like many years ago. 

There are also several wagons and freight items that are under restoration and operational.

Some signs of the original rolling stock is visible in the countryside surrounding the railway. It may be seen on Google maps satellite view.

Wagons  
The railway owns a few vintage Great Eastern covered vans, one LNER van, a special LNER survivor; a 'Toad B' brake van No. 157787, due to the mass amount of vans and minuscule open wagons, the MSLR built a replica open wagon to a GER design in 2012.

Former stock

Carriages

Wagons

References 

Locomotives by railway
Mid-Suffolk Light Railway